The Pearce Baronetcy, of Cardell in the County of Renfrew, was a title in the Baronetage of the United Kingdom. It was created on 21 July 1887 for the shipbuilder and Conservative politician William Pearce. His only son, the second Baronet, was also a businessman and Conservative Member of Parliament. He was childless and the title became extinct on his death in 1907.

Pearce baronets, of Cardell (1887)
Sir William Pearce, 1st Baronet (1833–1888)
Sir William George Pearce, 2nd Baronet (1861–1907)

References

Extinct baronetcies in the Baronetage of the United Kingdom